Sumac ( or ), also spelled sumach, is any of about 35 species of flowering plants in the genus Rhus and related genera in the cashew family (Anacardiaceae). Sumacs grow in subtropical and temperate regions throughout the world, including East Asia, Africa, and North America. Sumac is used as a spice, as a dye, and in medicine.

Description
The leaves are usually pinnately compound, though some species have trifoliate or simple leaves. The fruits are reddish, thin-fleshed drupes covered in varying levels of hairs at maturity and form dense clusters at branch tips, sometimes called sumac bobs.

Sumacs propagate both by seed (spread by birds and other animals through their droppings), and by new shoots from rhizomes, forming large clonal colonies.

Taxonomy
The taxonomy of Rhus has a long history, with de Candolle proposing a subgeneric classification with 5 sections in 1825. At its largest circumscription, Rhus, with over 250 species, has been the largest genus in the family Anacardiaceae.

Other authors used subgenera and placed some species in separate genera, hence the use of Rhus sensu lato and Rhus sensu stricto (s.s.). One classification uses two subgenera, Rhus (about 10 spp.) and Lobadium (about 25 spp.), while at the same time Cotinus, Duckera, Malosma, Metopium, Searsia and Toxicodendron segregated to create Rhus s.s.. Other genera that have been segregated include Actinocheita and Baronia. As defined, Rhus s.s. appears monophyletic by molecular phylogeny research. However the subgenera do not appear to be monophyletic. The larger subgenus, Lobadium, has been divided further into sections, Lobadium, Terebinthifolia. and Styphonia (two subsections).

Selected species, by continent

Asia and southern Europe
 Rhus chinensis Mill. – Chinese sumac
 Rhus coriaria – Sicilian sumac, Tanner's sumac
 Rhus delavayi Franchet

Australia, Pacific
 Rhus taitensis Guill. (Northeast Australia, Malesia, Micronesia, French Polynesia)
 Rhus sandwicensis A.Gray – neneleau or Hawaiian sumac (Hawaii)

North Africa
 Rhus tripartita (Ucria) Grande (Tunisia) – jedari; classified by Moffett under genus Searsia

North America
 Rhus aromatica – fragrant sumac
 Rhus copallinum – winged or shining sumac
 Rhus glabra – smooth sumac
 Rhus integrifolia – lemonade sumac
 Rhus kearneyi – Kearney sumac
 Rhus lanceolata – prairie sumac
 †Rhus malloryi Wolfe & Wehr – Ypresian, Washington
 Rhus michauxii – Michaux's sumac
 Rhus microphylla – desert sumac, littleleaf sumac
 Rhus ovata – sugar sumac
 †Rhus republicensis Flynn, DeVore, & Pigg-Ypresian, Washington
 †Rhus rooseae Manchester – Middle Eocene, Oregon
 Rhus trilobata Nutt. – skunkbush sumac
 Rhus typhina – staghorn sumac
 Rhus virens Lindh. ex A.Gray– evergreen sumac

South Africa
 Rhus crenata – dune crow-berry

Etymology
The word sumac traces its etymology from Old French sumac (13th century), from Mediaeval Latin sumach, from Arabic , from Syriac  (ܣܘܡܩܐ)- meaning "red". The generic name Rhus derives from Ancient Greek ῥοῦς (rhous), meaning "sumac", of unknown etymology; the suggestion that it is connected with the verb ῥέω (rheō), "to flow", is now rejected by scholars.

Cultivation and uses

Species including the fragrant sumac (R. aromatica), the littleleaf sumac (R. microphylla), the smooth sumac (R. glabra), and the staghorn sumac (R. typhina) are grown for ornament, either as the wild types or as cultivars.

In food
The dried fruits of some species are ground to produce a tangy, crimson spice popular in many countries. Fruits are also used to make a traditional "pink lemonade" beverage by steeping them in water, straining to remove the hairs that may irritate the mouth or throat, sometimes adding sweeteners such as honey or sugar. Most Rhus species contain only trace amounts of vitamin C and none should be considered a dietary source of this nutrient. In comparative research, the fruits of Rhus coriaria were found to contain the highest levels of ascorbic acid at approximately 39 mg/kg. (It therefore takes three pounds (1.36 kg) or more of sumac fruits to match the vitamin C content of a single average lemon, at over 50 mg.) Sumac's tart flavor comes from high amounts of malic acid.

The fruits (drupes) of  Rhus coriaria are ground into a reddish-purple powder used as a spice in Middle Eastern cuisine to add a tart, lemony taste to salads or meat. In Arab cuisine, it is used as a garnish on meze dishes such as hummus and tashi, it is also commonly added to falafel. Syria uses the spice also, it is one of the main ingredients of Kubah Sumakieh in Aleppo of Syria, it is added to salads in the Levant, as well as being one of the main ingredients in the Palestinian dish musakhan. In Afghan, Armenian, Bangladeshi, Iraqi, Indian, Iranian, Mizrahi, and Pakistani cuisines, sumac is added to rice or kebab. In Armenian, Azerbaijani, Central Asian, Syrian, Iraqi, Jordanian, Palestinian, Lebanese, Turkish cuisine and Kurdish, it is added to salads,  kebab and lahmajoun. Rhus coriaria is used in the spice mixture za'atar.

During medieval times, primarily from the thirteenth to fifteenth centuries, sumac appeared in cookbooks frequently used by the affluent in Western Europe. One dish in particular called sumāqiyya, a stew made from sumac, was frequently anglicized as "somacchia" by Europeans.

In North America, the smooth sumac (R. glabra), three-leaf sumac (R. trilobata), and staghorn sumac (R. typhina) are sometimes used to make a beverage termed "sumac-ade", "Indian lemonade", or "rhus juice". This drink is made by soaking the drupes in cool water, rubbing them to extract the essence, straining the liquid through a cotton cloth, and sweetening it. Native Americans also use the leaves and drupes of these sumacs combined with tobacco in traditional smoking mixtures.

Dye and tanning agent
The leaves and bark of most sumac species contain high levels of tannins and have been used in the manufacturing of leather by many cultures around the world. The Hebrew name og ha-bursaka'im means "tanner's sumac", as does the Latin name of R. coriaria. The leaves of certain sumacs yield tannin (mostly pyrogallol-type), a substance used in vegetable tanning. Notable sources include the leaves of R. coriaria, Chinese gall on R. chinensis, and wood and roots of R. pentaphylla. Leather tanned with sumac is flexible, light in weight, and light in color. One type of leather made with sumac tannins is morocco leather.

The dyeing property of sumac needed to be considered when it was shipped as a fine floury substance in sacks as a light cargo accompanying heavy cargoes such as marble. Sumac was especially dangerous to marble: "When sumac dust settles on white marble, the result is not immediately apparent, but if it once becomes wet, or even damp, it becomes a powerful purple dye, which penetrates the marble to an extraordinary depth."

 was used only for the outerwear of the Emperor of Japan, thus being one of the forbidden сolors.

Traditional medicinal use
Sumac was used as a treatment for several different ailments in medieval medicine, primarily in Middle Eastern and South Asian countries (where sumac was more readily available than in Europe). An 11th-century shipwreck off the coast of Rhodes, excavated by archeologists in the 1970s, contained commercial quantities of sumac drupes. These could have been intended for use as medicine, as a culinary spice, or as a dye. A clinical study showed that dietary sumac decreases the blood pressure in patients with hypertension and can be used as adjunctive treatment.

Other uses
Some beekeepers use dried sumac bobs as a source of fuel for their smokers.

Sumac stems also have a soft pith in the center that is easily removed to make them useful in traditional Native American pipemaking. They were commonly used as pipe stems in the northern United States.

Dried sumac wood fluoresces under long-wave ultraviolet radiation.

Toxicity and control
Some species formerly recognized in Rhus, such as poison ivy (Toxicodendron radicans, syn. Rhus toxicodendron), poison oak (Toxicodendron diversilobum, syn. Rhus diversiloba), and poison sumac (Toxicodendron vernix, syn. Rhus vernix), produce the allergen urushiol and can cause severe allergic reactions. Poison sumac may be identified by its white drupes, which are quite different from the red drupes of true Rhus species.

Mowing of sumac is not a good control measure, since the wood is springy, resulting in jagged, sharp-pointed stumps when mown. The plant will quickly recover with new growth after mowing. Goats have long been considered an efficient and quick removal method, as they eat the bark, which helps prevent new shoots. Sumac propagates by rhizome. Small shoots will be found growing near a more mature sumac tree via a shallow running root quite some distance from the primary tree. Thus, root pruning is a means of control without eliminating the plants altogether.

Explanatory notes

References

Further reading

 RO Moffett. "A Revision of Southern African Rhus species".  FSA (Flora of South Africa) vol 19 (3) Fascicle 1.

External links 
 

 
Arab cuisine
Caucasian cuisine
Dioecious plants
Mediterranean cuisine
Middle Eastern cuisine
Sour foods
Spices